Historic Masonic Temple of Santa Cruz de Tenerife is a Masonic Temple located in the city of Santa Cruz de Tenerife (Canary Islands, Spain), on Calle San Lucas. The building was constructed for use by the Añaza Lodge between 1899 and 1902. It is considered one of the main Masonic temples in Spain, and the first in the Canary Islands.

The Añaza Lodge, The Canary Islands' most important 20th century Masonic lodge, was founded on August 8, 1895. It consolidated rapidly, causing Canary Island Masonry to reorganize in the first part of the century.

The building contains strong symbolism, mostly inspired by the architectural tradition of ancient Egypt.

The façade is divided into three sections, the central has two huge columns with a plain shaft and palm-leaf capitals, supporting a bulky triangular pediment. In this eye there is a radiant ray, representing the Supreme Being, Great Architect of the Universe according to Masonic symbolism. Flanking each column are two sphinxes (four in total) lying on their stomachs and covered with a nemes. They were carved by the sculptor Compañ Zamorano Guzman (1878–1944). The main door is wood and carved with geometric patterns. The lintel is decorated with palm leaves and a sun with wings of an eagle, symbol of the deity Horus. The building stands on an stereobate. 

The Masonic Temple of Santa Cruz de Tenerife is located at the same latitude (28º north) of the Saint Catherine's Monastery of Mount Sinai (Egypt). This monastery was built in the place where according to the Old Testament, Moses received the Tables of the Law.

The building it was listed as a Site of cultural interest by the Government of the Canary Islands in 2007.

Scottish Rite Masonic Congress 2016 
In November 2016 the Masonic international congress Convent of the Order, was held in Santa Cruz de Tenerife. This is an event held annually in different parts of the world and was organized by the Supreme Council of the 33rd Degree of the Ancient and Accepted Scottish Rite for Spain. This conference helped raise funds for the rehabilitation of the Masonic Temple of Santa Cruz de Tenerife.

The Congress was attended by over 300 members representing 17 of the 57 regular Supreme Councils in the world, emphasising the importance of the event for the Ancient and Accepted Scottish Rite part of the global Masonic community. During the meeting in the Masonic Temple the act to create the Confederación Iberoamericana de Supremos Consejos (Latin American Confederation of Supreme Councils) was signed.

References

Related articles 
 Fonseca House

External links 
 Masonic Temple of Santa Cruz de Tenerife. Official Website.
 Masonería.org – in spanish

Masonic buildings completed in 1902
Buildings and structures in Santa Cruz de Tenerife
Religious buildings and structures in the Canary Islands
Bien de Interés Cultural landmarks in the Province of Santa Cruz de Tenerife